The North Wales Coast FA Intermediate Cup is a football knockout tournament involving teams from in North Wales who play in leagues administered and associated with the North Wales Coast Football Association.

Previous winners
The competition was originally known as the North Wales Coast Amateur Cup ran from 1894 to 1975 with the exception of when the competition was suspended during the war years. For the 1975–76 season it was renamed the North Wales Coast FA Intermediate Cup running until the end of the 1980–81 season. The competition did not run from 1981 until the 2008–09 season when it was reintroduced. It ran again until the 2015–16 season, after which it was suspended again. After a restructure of league football in North Wales, the competition was planned for return for the 2020–21 season but due to the Covid-19 pandemic the competition was cancelled, instead returning for the 2021–22 season.

1890s

1894–95: – Bangor
1895–96: – Bangor
1896–97: – Llandudno Swifts
1897–98: – Bangor
1898-99: – Bangor
1899–1900: – Llandudno

1900s

1900–01: – Bangor
1901–02: – Rhyl
1902–03: – Bangor
1903–04: – Llandudno
1904–05: – Bangor
1905–06: – Bangor reserves
1906–07: – Holyhead
1907–08: – Holyhead
1908-09: – Caernarfon
1909–10: – Flint

1910s

1910–11: – Caernarfon
1911–12: – Bangor
1912–13: – Rhyl
1913–14: – Holywell
1914–15: – No competition - World War One
1915–16: – No competition - World War One
1916–17: – No competition - World War One
1917–18: – No competition - World War One
1918–19: – No competition - World War One– 
1919–20: – Bagilit

1920s

1920–21: – Holyhead Railway Institute
1921–22: – Holywell
1922–23: – Caernarfon
1923–24: – Denbigh
1924–25: – Penmaenmawr
1925–26: – Conway
1926–27: – Conway
1927–28: – Llanfairfechan 
1928-29: – Llandudno reserves
1929–30: – Bettisfield (Bagillt)

1930s

1930–31: – Flint Town Amateurs 
1931–32: – Flint Town Amateurs 
1932–33: – Flint Town Amateurs 
1933–34: – Flint Town Amateurs 
1934–35: – Flint Town
1935–36: – Flint Town
1936–37: – Buckley Town
1937–38: – Portmadoc
1938-39: – Buckley Town
1939–40: – Flint Athletic

1940s

1940–41: – No competition - World War Two
1941–42: – No competition - World War Two
1942–43: – No competition - World War Two
1943–44: – No competition - World War Two
1944–45: – No competition - World War Two
1945–46: – Conwy Borough
1946–47: – Caernarfon Town
1947–48: – Llandudno
1948-49: – Holywell
1949–50: – Holyhead Town

1950s

1950–51: – Connah’s Quay Albion
1951–52: – Connah’s Quay Juniors
1952–53: – Connah’s Quay Nomads
1953–54: – Buckley Wanderers
1954–55: – Connah’s Quay Nomads
1955–56: – Barmouth
1956–57: – Portmadoc
1957–58: – Holywell Town
1958-59: – Portmadoc
1959–60: – Bala Town

1960s

1960–61: – Newborough
1961–62: – Llandudno
1962–63: – Portmadoc
1963–64: – Peritus
1964–65: – Llanberis
1965–66: – Buckley Wanderers
1966–67: – Ruthin
1967–68: – Llanberis Athletic
1968-69: – Flint Town United
1969–70: – Denbigh Town

1970s

1970–71: – Llangoed & District
1971–72: – Mostyn YMCA
1972–73: – Ruthin
1973–74: – Nantlle Vale
1974–75: – Nantlle Vale
1975–76: – Nantlle Vale
1976–77: – Flint Town United
1977–78: – Caernarfon Town
1978–79: – Courtaulds Greenfield
1979–80: – Llanberis

1980s

1980–81: – Connah’s Quay Nomads

2010s

2008–09: – Greenfield
2009–10: – Prestatyn Town reserves

2010s

2010–11: – Glantraeth
2011–12: – Prestatyn Rovers
2012–13: – Llansannan
2013–14: – Caernarfon Town reserves
2014–15: – Prestatyn Sports
2015–16: – Llanystumdwy
2016–17: – Competition suspended
2017–18: – Competition suspended
2018–19: – Competition suspended
2019–20: – Competition suspended

2020s

2020–21: – No competition - Covid-19 pandemic
2021–22: –

References

Football cup competitions in Wales
County Cup competitions
Football in Wales
1894 establishments in Wales